The year 2023 will be the 20th year in the history of the Konfrontacja Sztuk Walki, a mixed martial arts promotion based in Poland. 2023 will begin with KSW 78. For 2023, besides its own channels KSW announced official distribution partnerships with Viaplay and Fight Network, to broadcast the promotion's Pay-per-view events.

List of events

XTB KSW 78: Materla vs. Grove 2

XTB KSW 78: Materla vs. Grove 2 was a mixed martial arts event held by Konfrontacja Sztuk Walki on January 21, 2023 in Szczecin, Poland.

Background
The main event was set to feature a heavyweight bout between Former professional boxer Artur Szpilka and former Glory fighter Arkadiusz Wrzosek. However, on November 16, Szpilka had to withdraw from the fight due to a back injury.

Bonus awards

The following fighters were awarded bonuses:
 Fight of the Night: Tomasz Romanowski vs. Radosław Paczuski
 Submission of the Night: Roman Szymański
 Knockout of the Night: Valeriu Mircea

Fight Card

KSW 79: De Fries vs. Duffee 

KSW 79: De Fries vs. Duffee was a mixed martial arts event held by Konfrontacja Sztuk Walki on February 25, 2023 at the Home Credit Arena in Liberec, Czech Republic .

Background
A heavyweight bout between two former kickboxers, Arkadiusz Wrzosek and Tomáš Možný, was booked for the event. The pair previously fought under kickboxing rules on October 16, 2015, with Možný winning by unanimous decision.

Bonus awards

The following fighters were awarded bonuses:
 Fight of the Night: Arkadiusz Wrzosek vs.Tomáš Možný  
 Knockout of the Night: Brian Hooi and Ramzan Jembiev

Fight card

KSW 80: Ruchała vs. Eskiev 

KSW 80: Ruchała vs. Eskiev was a mixed martial arts event held by Konfrontacja Sztuk Walki on March 17, 2023 at the RCS Hall in Lubin, Poland.

Background
Robert Ruchała was expected to face Dawid Śmiełowski for the interim KSW Featherweight Championship in the main event. Śmiełowski withdrew with an injury on February 25, and was replaced by Lom-Ali Eskiev.

Bonus awards

The following fighters were awarded bonuses:
 Fight of the Night:
 Submission of the Night:
 Knockout of the Night:

Fight card

XTB KSW 81: Bartosiński vs. Szczepaniak 

XTB KSW 81: Bartosiński vs. Szczepaniak will be a mixed martial arts event held by Konfrontacja Sztuk Walki on April 22, 2023 at the Ice Arena Tomaszów Mazowiecki in Tomaszów Mazowiecki, Poland.

Background
A KSW Welterweight Championship bout between Adrian Bartosiński and Artur Szczepaniak is scheduled to headline the event.

Bonus awards

The following fighters were awarded bonuses:
 Fight of the Night:
 Submission of the Night:
 Knockout of the Night:

Fight card

KSW 82 

KSW 82 will be a mixed martial arts event held by Konfrontacja Sztuk Walki on May 13, 2023 at the ATM Studio in Warsaw, Poland.

Background

Bonus awards

The following fighters were awarded bonuses:
 Fight of the Night:
 Submission of the Night:
 Knockout of the Night:

Fight card

XTB KSW 83: Colosseum 2

XTB KSW 83: Colosseum 2 will be a mixed martial arts event held by Konfrontacja Sztuk Walki on June 3, 2023 at the PGE Narodowy in Warsaw, Poland.

Background

Bonus awards

The following fighters were awarded bonuses:
 Fight of the Night:
 Submission of the Night:
 Knockout of the Night:

Fight card

KSW 84 

KSW 84 will be a mixed martial arts event held by Konfrontacja Sztuk Walki on 2023.

Background

Bonus awards

The following fighters were awarded bonuses:
 Fight of the Night:
 Submission of the Night:
 Knockout of the Night:

Fight card

See also
 List of current KSW fighters
 2023 in UFC
 2023 in Bellator MMA
 2023 in ONE Championship
 2023 in Absolute Championship Akhmat
 2023 in Rizin Fighting Federation
 2023 in AMC Fight Nights
 2023 in Brave Combat Federation
 2023 in Road FC
 2023 Professional Fighters League season
 2023 in Eagle Fighting Championship

References

External links
KSW

2023 in mixed martial arts
Konfrontacja Sztuk Walki events
Konfrontacja Sztuk Walki events
2023 sport-related lists